"Can Heaven Wait" is a song by American singer-songwriter Luther Vandross. It was written by Carsten Shack, Kenneth Karlin, Joshua Thompson, Danny Mercado, Quincy Patrick, and Joe Thomas for his self-titled twelfth studio album (2001), with production helmed by Shack and Karlin under their production moniker Soulshock & Karlin. The song was released as the album's second single.

Track listing
US CD Single

Charts

References

2001 songs
Luther Vandross songs
2001 singles
J Records singles
Songs written by Soulshock
Songs written by Kenneth Karlin
Songs written by Joe (singer)